Dr. Olga Mohan High School (DOMHS), formerly known as College Ready Academy High School # 4, is an independent non-profit start-up charter high school that is located on 644 W 17th St, Los Angeles, California, United States.

Dr. Olga Mohan High School, which serves grades 9 through 12, is part of the Alliance College-Ready Public Schools. The Charter school was founded in August 2006.

Awards
Over the years DOMHS has received the following awards:

 2015 U.S. News & World Report Rankings: #74 in Los Angeles, #58 in California, #311 in the United States 
 2013 U.S. News & World Report Rankings: #1 in Los Angeles, #14 in California, #95 in the United States
 2013 California Distinguished School
2011 Charter School of the Year Hart Vision Award by the California Charter School Association
 2010 California Distinguished School
 2009-10 EPIC Gold Gain Award
 2009-10 Title I Achievement Award
 2008-09 EPIC Silver Gain Award
 2008-2009 Title 1 Achievement Award

References

External links
 
 http://www.mohanhs.org/apps/pages/index.jsp?uREC_ID=199850&type=d&pREC_ID=432059

High schools in Los Angeles County, California
Educational institutions established in 2006
2006 establishments in California